Bechara Boutros al-Rahi (or Raï; ;) (born on 25 February 1940) is the 77th Maronite Patriarch of Antioch, and head of the Maronite Church, a position he has held since March 15, 2011, succeeding Patriarch Nasrallah Boutros Sfeir. Rahi was made a cardinal on 24 November 2012 by Pope Benedict XVI.

Early life and education
Mar Bechara Boutros al-Rahi was born in Himlaya, Matn District, Lebanon on 25 February 1940. He attended Collège Notre Dame de Jamhour, a Jesuit school in Lebanon. He entered the Mariamite Maronite Order on 31 July 1962 and was ordained as a priest on 3 September 1967. From 1967 to 1975 he was responsible for the Arabic programs of Vatican Radio. In 1975, he received a PhD in canon and civil law. He also studied for three years at Lateran University in Rome.

Religious positions
He was appointed titular bishop of Caesarea Philippi on 2 May 1986 and consecrated as auxiliary Bishop of Antioch on 12 July 1986, by Patriarch Nasrallah Boutros Sfeir and his co-consecrators were Roland Aboujaoudé, Auxiliary Bishop of Antioch, Georges Abi-Saber, titular Bishop of Aradus, Chucrallah Harb, Eparch of Jounieh, Joseph Mohsen Béchara, Archeparch of Cyprus, Khalil Abi-Nader, Archeparch of Beirut, Ignace Ziadé, Emeritus Archeparch of Beirut, Antoine Joubeir, Archeparch of Tripoli, Elie Farah, Emeritus Archeparch of Cyprus, Joseph Merhi, Eparch of Cairo and Ibrahim Hélou, Eparch of Sidon. On 9 June 1990, he was elected bishop of Byblos. In 2003 he was elected Secretary of the Maronite Synod, and in 2009 he was appointed President of the Lebanese Episcopal Commission for the Media.

Maronite Patriarch
At 71, he was elected patriarch of the Maronites on 15 March 2011, after getting more than two-thirds of the votes of the 39 bishops and replacing Nasrallah Sfeir. The new patriarch formally requested and received ecclesiastical communion from Pope Benedict XVI on 24 March 2011 pursuant to Canon 76 § 2 of the Code of Canons of the Eastern Churches. The Mass for the inauguration of his Patriarchate took place on 25 March 2011, in Bkerké, the see of the Maronite Catholic Patriarchate. As is customary for all Maronite Patriarchs, Patriarch al-Rahi took the additional name Boutros, that of Saint Peter, who briefly held the See of Antioch before moving to Rome to become Bishop there. On 7 March 2012, Patriarch al-Rahi was appointed a member of the Congregation for the Oriental Churches.

Al-Rahi was made a cardinal by Pope Benedict XVI in a consistory on 24 November 2012. Al-Rahi was the fourth Maronite Patriarch created cardinal, the first three being his three immediate predecessors Paul Peter Meouchi, Anthony Peter Khoraish, and Nasrallah Sfeir.

On 31 January 2013, al-Rahi was appointed by Pope Benedict XVI to serve as a member of the Congregation for the Oriental Churches, the Supreme Tribunal of the Apostolic Signatura, the Pontifical Council for the Pastoral Care of Migrants and Itinerants, and the Pontifical Council for Social Communications.

In February 2013, following the resignation of Pope Benedict XVI, al-Rahi participated as a cardinal elector in the conclave that elected Pope Francis. Cardinal al-Rahi was one of four cardinal-electors from outside the Latin Church who wore distinct vestments proper to their respective churches.  The other three cardinal-electors from outside the Latin Church were Coptic Catholic Patriarch-Emeritus Antonios Naguib, Syro Malabar Major Archbishop George Alencherry, and Syro-Malankara Major Archbishop Baselios Cleemis.  Cardinal al-Rahi's attire during the opening day was distinct from most of the other electors in that he wore all-red vestments with distinct headgear proper to the Maronite Church. Cardinal al-Rahi is also the first Maronite Cardinal Patriarch ever to participate in a papal conclave.

He was named a member of the Congregation for Catholic Education by Pope Francis on 30 November 2013.

On 18 March 2015, al-Rahi became the sole cardinal-elector from the order of cardinal-bishops when Cardinal Naguib turned 80. He remained the sole cardinal-bishop elector until 28 June 2018 when four Latin church cardinals of voting age from the priestly and diaconal orders were elevated by Pope Francis to cardinal-bishop by having their titular churches co-opted to suburbicarian rank and Louis Raphaël I Sako, Patriarch of the Chaldean Catholic Church was created a cardinal-patriarch. Cardinal al-Rahi ceased to be a cardinal-elector on his 80th birthday in 2020.

Political views
In April 2011, al-Rahi said that, for the sake of communion and love, he would work "to establish a sincere and complete dialogue" with Muslims "and build together a future in common life and cooperation." He said his predecessor "struggled with insistence to free both the national decision-making and the land of Lebanon from all forms of tutelage and occupation, worked for reconciliation in Mount Lebanon and realized needed church reforms. All of these constitute an extension of the church's springtime started by the Second Vatican Council." Patriarch al-Rahi does not use the term "Arab Spring", but "Arab Winter" to express his unenthusiastic reaction.

Syria and Hezbollah
In September 2011, some of the Christian supporters of the March 14 alliance were upset over his controversial comments in Paris, France where he supported Hezbollah's right to hold arms in defense against Israel, and stated that the 2011 Syrian protests could awaken the rise of the Muslim Brotherhood if President Bashar al-Assad was removed from office. 14 March supporters stressed how his predecessor had very different views and was almost fanatically supportive of the Lebanese Forces. Christian supporters of the March 8 alliance welcomed his comments. Prime Minister Najib Mikati also supported his stance saying "The Maronite patriarch spoke about a part [of the problem]. No one is against the resistance’s arms as long as Israeli occupation continues. There is Lebanese unanimity on the resistance’s arms in the face of Israeli occupation." Mikati said after his meeting with al-Rahi that he was  "very relieved and reassured by the Patriarch’s wisdom." President Michel Suleiman said that "the Patriarch is not in need of anyone to defend him and his positions emanate from his central role as a person in charge of Lebanon's and the Middle East's Christians and that of Lebanon's independence and sovereignty;" and that "the patriarch does not need to be defended, and his stances represent his way of taking responsibility for Lebanon's Christians." 
  
Parliament speaker Nabih Berri said that al-Rahi's "comments in Paris protect Lebanon from danger and I agree with what he stated and affirm his vision that is rooted in both a religious and national background" and that "If the situation further deteriorated in Syria and we reached a more radical rule than the current rule, like the rule of the Muslim Brotherhood, Christians there would pay the price, either in the form of killings or displacement. Here is the picture of Iraq in front of us." 
  
Free Patriotic Movement leader Michel Aoun expressed support for al-Rahi: "Rai’s statements express the concerns of the minorities because he is entrusted with the Synod for the Middle East. Gradual changes doesn’t harm stability and wouldn’t get Syria into the [same] troubles as Palestine, Iraq, Libya and Yemen. [As some of the Syrian demonstrators are armed and are destroying the country] the Syrian government cannot but bring order to the country." Former 14 March Progressive Socialist Party leader Walid Jumblatt criticised al-Rahi's assessment on the grounds that "Lebanon cannot remain hostage to regional conflicts", and denied that regime change in Syria was posing a threat to Christians in the country.
  
In an interview with Reuters on 4 March 2012, al-Rahi said: "All regimes in the Arab world have Islam as a state religion, except for Syria. It stands out for not saying it is an Islamic state...The closest thing to democracy [in the Arab world] is Syria."

Visit to the Holy Land
On 26 May 2014, the patriarch decided to join Pope Francis on parts of the pontifical three-day Holy Land pilgrimage. The Maronite patriarch arrived late Sunday in Jerusalem after accompanying Francis in the West Bank, but he departed from the parts of the Catholic leader's itinerary that involved meetings with Israeli officials. After visiting a monastery outside the city on his way to Jaffa, al-Rahi joined the Pope again in the afternoon for Mass at Jerusalem's Cenacle. The patriarch then returned to the West Bank for a visit to Beit Sahour, toured the north, the Galilee region, Nazareth, Acre and Haifa, where many of the country's Arab Christian minority live.

The visit was criticized at home. The patriarch maintained that he was misunderstood and that his journey was celebrating the roots of Christianity in the region.

Visit to Saudi Arabia
In November 2017, the patriarch visited Saudi Arabia to meet King Salman, to become the first Maronite Patriarch to visit the kingdom.

Calls for international conference
On 27 February 2021, al-Rahi addressed in a rally the political and economic crisis in Lebanon, in which he said:

He also called for an international conference to solve Lebanese issues:
He repeated this call in 2022, during a conversation with Thomas Heine-Geldern, head of Aid to the Church in Need. "We are calling for a special international conference for Lebanon under the purview of the UN. We must also settle the issue of Palestinian and Syrian refugees. Finally, we must declare the positive neutrality of Lebanon. Without this, there is no solution. These are the conditions for the ‘message country’, as it was called by Pope John Paul II, to continue to bear its witness."

Domestic politics 
Given the sectarian nature of Lebanese politics, the head of the Maronite Church is generally cautious about making statements of a political nature, but has been known to criticise the domestic political scene, as he did in this interview with Aid to the Church in Need. "The Lebanese population is not what it once was. The Lebanese used to live with dignity, they were not dependent on anybody. The fact is that our politicians made the population poor, beggars. We are haemorrhaging people. Every day we lose thousands of our best engineers, our best doctors, our best teachers, because the loss of value of the Lebanese pound to the dollar destroyed the value of salaries."

Refugees 
The Patriarch has commended the generosity of the Lebanese for welcoming refugees since as far back as 1948, but warned that this cannot continue without help. "Our population never closed its borders. In 1948 we welcomed the Palestinian refugees. At the time our patriarch sent a letter to all the convents, schools and universities that belonged to the Maronite Church, to open their doors to them, because they were our brothers in need. They are still around half a million. We have a further 1.5 million Syrian refugees, as well, so we are looking after two million refugees. The International Community congratulates us, and tells us we are hospitable. But we don’t need to be told that we are hospitable. We can’t manage anymore.”

Distinctions
 : National Order of the Cedar by the President of Lebanon, Michel Suleiman (2012)
 : Grand Cross of the Legion of Honor by the President of France, Nicolas Sarkozy (2011)

Gallery

See also
Cardinals created by Pope Benedict XVI
List of Maronite Patriarchs
Maronite Church

Notes

References

External links

 
 
 Maronite Patriarchal See of Antioch

1940 births
Living people
Collège Notre Dame de Jamhour alumni
Pontifical Lateran University alumni
Lebanese religious leaders
Lebanese Maronites
Maronite Patriarchs of Antioch
Members of the Congregation for the Oriental Churches
Lebanese cardinals
Cardinals created by Pope Benedict XVI
Members of the Apostolic Signatura
Members of the Pontifical Council for Social Communications
People from Matn District